Bahadurpur railway station is a railway station under Sealdah railway division of  Eastern Railway system. It is situated beside National Highway 34 in Bahadurpur on the Krishnanagar–Lalgola line in Nadia in the Indian state of West Bengal. Few EMU and Lalgola passengers trains stop in Bahadurpur railway station.

Electrification
The 128 km-long Krishnanagar– stretch including Bahadurpur railway station was electrified in 2007 for EMU service.

References

Sealdah railway division
Railway stations in Nadia district
Railway stations opened in 1905
1905 establishments in India
Kolkata Suburban Railway stations